Orchipedum is the scientific name of two genera of organisms and may refer to:
 Orchipedum (plant), an orchid genus in the subfamily Orchidoideae
 Orchipedum (flatworm), a flatworm genus in the family Orchipedidae